Best. Concert. Ever. is a live concert CD/DVD by internet musician Jonathan Coulton. It was recorded live on February 22, 2008 at the Great American Music Hall in San Francisco, California.

The DVD features: Paul and Storm, Kristen Shirts on ukulele, Andy "The Human Keyboard" Bates on vocals, Jonathan Coulton on guitar and zendrum. Also included are documentary and interview segments, audio commentary, bonus material, and footage shot by actual fans on actual consumer-grade cameras.

Credits
 Executive producers: Christine Connor and Jonathan Coulton;
 Produced, directed and photographed by: Adam Feinstein and Jeremiah Crowell at Lucas Blank;
 Edited by: Christopher k. Dillon;
 Featuring: Paul Sabourin, Storm Costanza, Kristen Shirts, Merlin Mann, Veronica Belmont, Leo Laporte, and Andy Bates;
 Code Monkey dance and video by: Emily Mark;
 Audio recorded by: Paul Tumulo of Wildplum Recordings;
 Post production audio mix by: Devin Eke at Park Avenue Post;
 Package design by: Elizabeth Connor

Track list

2008 live albums
2008 video albums
Live video albums
Jonathan Coulton albums